The Nupi Lan were two demonstrations led by women in Manipur, British India against the colonial authorities. In 1904, the first Nupi Lan broke out in response to an order by the colonial authorities to send Manipuri men to the Kabow Valley to fetch timber for re-building the then Police Agent's bungalow. The second Nupi Lan broke out in 1939 in response to the export of rice during the Second World War.

First Nupi Lan

The first Nupi Lan which broke out in 1904 was against the order by the British colonial authorities to send Manipuri men to Kabow Valley to fetch timber for re-building the then Police Agent's bungalow after it was ravaged by fire. It was stirred up by the heirs-apparent of the erstwhile ruling family who did not like the selection of Chura Chand Singh as the King of Manipur. They persuaded the women of Manipur to resist the British colonial government's order to resuscitate the Lalup (A sort of forced labour where the male member of society between the age of 17 and 60 should work freely for ten days in every forty days of work). The struggle in which more than 5,000 women took part  lasted for a week. Although the British authorities had eventually succeeded in suppressing the uprising, they were compelled to rescind the order.

Second Nupi Lan

The second Nupi Lan was set off by the indiscriminate export of rice from Manipur by Marwari business men with the support of the colonial government. It resulted in a famine-like situation in Manipur even though it was harvest season.

Although the movement was started as an agitation by Manipuri women against the economic and administrative policies of the Manipur Maharaja and the Political Agent Mr. Grimson of the British Government (1933–45) in Manipur, it evolved into a movement for the constitutional and administrative reform in Manipur.

When the Manipuri women,  who had been playing a decisive role in the agrarian economy of the region, came out in legion on the streets against the British policy of massive export of rice, the authorities responded by deploying military and police force against the unarmed women protesters.  They fought valiantly against the British policies and a few of them lost their lives in the agitation. The struggle lasted for several months but subsided as a result of the outbreak of Second World War.

Importance

Historians opine that the Nupi Lan movement contributed much to the making of Manipur. First, it sowed the seeds of economic and political reforms. Secondly, it was a turning point to the political lives of leaders like Jan Neta Hijam Irabot whose major focus had, until then, been  social reforms. Irabot later turned a firebrand communist and founded the Communist Party in Manipur.

See also
Meira Paibi
Ima Market

External links
 http://www.epw.in/special-articles/nupi-lan-manipur-women-s-agitation-1939.html
 http://themanipurpage.tripod.com/history/nupilal.html

Political history of India
History of Manipur
Socialism in India
Social movements in India
Political uprisings in India